Jamaine Wray (born 15 March 1984) is a Jamaican former professional rugby league footballer who played in the 2000s and 2010s.

Representative career 
Jamaine Wray played, scored a try, and was man of the match in Jamaica's 26–36 defeat by United States in the 2010 Atlantic Cup at Hodges Stadium, Jacksonville, Florida on Tuesday 16 November 2010.

References

External links
Jamaine on youtube
Castleford Tigers 2003's Super League VIII
Search for "Jamaine Wray" at youtube.com
Search for "Jamaine Wray" at bbc.co.uk

1984 births
Living people
Expatriate rugby league players in England
Hunslet R.L.F.C. players
Jamaica national rugby league team players
Jamaica national rugby league team captains
Jamaican expatriate rugby league players
Jamaican expatriate sportspeople in England
Jamaican rugby league players
Keighley Cougars players
Place of birth missing (living people)
Rugby league hookers
Rugby league locks
West Indies national rugby league team players
York City Knights players